This is a list of Norwegian football transfers in the 2018 summer transfer window by club. Only clubs of the 2018 Eliteserien and 2018 OBOS-ligaen are included.

Eliteserien

Bodø/Glimt

In:

Out:

Brann

In:

Out:

Haugesund

In:

Out:

Kristiansund

In:

 
 
 

Out:

Lillestrøm

In:

Out:

Molde

In:

Out:

Odd

In:

Out:

Ranheim

In:

Out:

Rosenborg

In:

Out:

Sandefjord

In:

Out:

Sarpsborg 08

In:

Out:

Stabæk

In:

Out:

Start

In:

Out:

Strømsgodset

In:

 
 

 

Out:

Tromsø

In:

Out:

Vålerenga

In:

Out:

1. divisjon

Aalesund

In:

Out:

Florø

In:

Out:

HamKam

In:

Out:

Jerv

In:

Out:

Kongsvinger

In:

Out:

Levanger

In:

Out:

Mjøndalen

In:

Out:

Nest-Sotra

In:

Out:

Notodden

In:

Out:

Sandnes Ulf

In:

Out:

Sogndal

In:

Out:

Strømmen

In:

Out:

Tromsdalen

In:

Out:

Ull/Kisa

In:

Out:

Viking

In:

Out:

Åsane

In:

Out:

References

Norway
Transfers
2018